Hugh Fraser, Baronet of Allander may refer to:
Hugh Fraser, 1st Baron Fraser of Allander (1903–1966), 1st Baronet
Sir Hugh Fraser, 2nd Baronet (1936–1987), his son

See also 
Hugh Fraser (disambiguation)